The University of Balochistan (UB) (Urdu: جامعہ بلوچستان; Balochi: بلوچستان ء یونیورسٹی ), also known as Balochistan University, is a public university located in the downtown area of Quetta, Balochistan, Pakistan. UoB is the oldest highest education institution in Balochistan, having been established in 1970.

History
The university was established in October 1970 through an ordinance issued by the governor of Balochistan, Riaz Hussain. In June 1996, the Provincial Assembly of Balochistan passed the University of Balochistan Act 1996. Thus the university became the sole general university of the province, imparting higher education in arts, science, commerce and humanities.

It started with three departments: Physics, Chemistry and Geology. Over time new departments were established (the Institute of Management Sciences, Institute of Bio-Chemistry, Institute of Education & Research, Institute of Languages & Literature) and five specialized centers (Center of Excellence in Mineralogy, Pakistan Study Center, Area Study Center, Balochistan Study Center, Center for Advance Studies in Vaccinology and Bio-Technology) of higher studies and research. One constituent Law College, four sub-campuses (Mastung, Kharan, Pishin, Killa-Saifullah) and several other affiliated colleges. Furthermore, the Abdul Samad Khan Shaheed Chair, and Nawab Yousaf Aziz Magsi Chair have been established at UB.

After dissolution of One Unit, 200 acres of land, along with the teaching, academic and residential structures built to house the College for Mineral Technology, were handed over to the University of Balochistan.

Authorities of the university
The following are the authorities of the university:
 The Senate
 The Syndicate
 The Academic Council
 The Board of Faculties
 The Board of Studies
 The Selection Board
 The Advanced Studies and Research Board
 The Finance and Planning Committee
 The Affiliation Committee
 The Discipline Committee

Faculties and departments
The university started with three departments, Physics, Chemistry and Geology in 1971 but now it has 46 departments. The university has four institutes and five centers. A Fine Arts Department was established in March 1984 with four faculty members, Jamal Shah, Faryal Gohar, Akram Dost and Kaleem Khan. Initially the department offered a certificate course. It deals with painting, drawing, sculpture and graphic art as well as historical theories of human development through the ages. The department plays very important role in introducing Balochistan's heritage and its indigenous art, crafts and architecture. Since the civilization of Mehrgarh (9000 BCE) is a great source of inspiration for researchers and provide linkage with the other world of art and craft. The Department of Fine Arts also provides a facility to study in depth the cultural heritage of Balochistan.

The university has also established a computer science department to promote IT.

List of faculties and departments/programs:

1. Faculty of Management Sciences, Business and Information Sciences 
 Commerce 
 Institute of Management Sciences
 Economics 
 Department of Computer Science & Information Technology 
 Library and Information Science

2. Faculty of Social Science
 Political Science
 Sociology
 Social work
 International Relations
 Law 
 Pakistan Study Centre
 Balochistan Study Centre
 Disaster Management and Development Studies

3. Faculty of Education & Humanities
 Media & Journalism 
 Gender Studies
 History
 Philosophy
 Psychology
 Fine Arts
 Islamic Studies
 Area study centre
 Institute of Education And Research

4. Faculty of Literature & Languages
 Balochi
 Brahvi
 English Language
 English Literature
 Pashto 
 Persian
 Urdu Literature

5. Faculty of Basic Sciences
 Physics
 Chemistry
 Mathematics
 Statistics

6. Faculty of Earth & Environment Sciences
 Geology
 Geography
 Environmental Science
 Center of Excellence in Mineralogy
 Renewable Energy

7. Faculty of Life Sciences
 Physiotherapy
 Bio-Chemistry
 Botany
 Zoology
 Pharmacy 
 Microbiology
 Center for Advance Studies in Vaccinology and Bio-Technology (CASVAB)

Colleges
The university has a constituent law college and 88 affiliated colleges including:
 Balochistan Agriculture College
 Bolan Medical College
 Pakistan Command and Staff College, Quetta

Notable alumni and faculty

 Zubaida Jalal Khan (Minister of Defense Production)
 Sadiq Sanjrani (Chairman of the Senate of Pakistan)
 Abdul Quddus Bizenjo
 Jamal Shah
 Samson Simon Sharaf
 Orya Maqbool Jan
 Rustam Jamali
 Tahira Safdar
 Safdar Kiyani
 Alauddin Marri
 Rahila Durrani
 Ayub Khoso
 Seumas Kerr CBE (Major General in the British Army)

See also
 Balochistan Agriculture College
 List of universities in Pakistan

References

External links
 
 Quetta Results website
 University of Balochistan info on HEC, Pakistan's website

 
Public universities and colleges in Balochistan, Pakistan
University of Balochistan alumni
Educational institutions established in 1970
1970 establishments in Pakistan
Universities and colleges in Quetta District